The 1926 World Table Tennis Championships women's singles was the first edition of the women's singles championship.
Mária Mednyánszky defeated Doris Gubbins in the final of this event 21–15, 21–19.

Draw

Finals

See also
List of World Table Tennis Championships medalists

References

-
World